Frederick James Kroesen Jr. (February 11, 1923 – April 30, 2020) was a United States Army four-star general who served as the Commanding General of the Seventh United States Army and the commander of NATO Central Army Group from 1979 to 1983, and Commanding General, United States Army Forces Command from 1976 to 1978. He also served as Vice Chief of Staff of the United States Army from 1978 to 1979. He commanded troops in World War II, the Korean War, and the Vietnam War, enabling him to be one of the very small number who ever was entitled to wear the Combat Infantryman Badge with two Stars, denoting active combat in three wars.

Early life
Kroesen was born in Phillipsburg, New Jersey, the son of Jean (Shillinger) and Frederick Kroesen, who worked for the New Jersey state government.  His paternal ancestor, Garret Dircksen Kroesen (1638-1680) arrived in America (New Netherland) from the Netherlands around 1661. Kroesen moved to the Lawrenceville section of Lawrence Township, Mercer County, New Jersey as a child and he attended Trenton Central High School. A 1944 graduate of Rutgers University, he earned a Bachelor of Science degree in Agriculture. He earned Bachelor of Arts (1962) and Master of Arts (1966) degrees in International Affairs at George Washington University. In addition, he was also a member of Delta Upsilon fraternity to which his membership traces back to his days at Rutgers University.

Military career

World War II
In 1944 Kroesen was commissioned through the Infantry Officer Candidate School at Fort Benning, Georgia, then fought in World War II with the 254th Infantry Regiment of the 63rd Infantry Division. He was a company grade officer, serving as platoon leader and company commander, in the fighting in the Colmar Pocket and into Germany. On the 26 and 27 January 1945, he participated in the particularly tough fighting in Jebsheim.

Korean War
During the Korean War Kroesen served in Korea with the 187th Airborne Regimental Combat Team.

Vietnam War
Kroesen was the commander of the 196th Light Infantry Brigade of the 23rd Infantry Division in 1968. He was an adviser to the assistant chief of staff, J-3, in Vietnam, and then served there as commander of the 23rd Infantry Division; deputy commander, XXIV Corps; and commanding general, First Regional Assistance Command.

Post-Vietnam
After returning from Vietnam, Kroesen served as Deputy Commander, XXIV Corps (1972), Commanding General, 82nd Airborne Division (1972–1974), Deputy Commanding General, V Corps (1974–1975) and Commanding General, VII Corps (1975–1976).

In 1976 Kroesen was promoted to the rank of four star general (O-10), becoming the first Officer Candidate School (OCS) graduate to hold that rank. He then served as Commanding General, United States Army Forces Command (1976–1978) and Vice Chief of Staff of the United States Army (1978–1979).

Red Army Faction attack
From 1979 to 1983 Kroesen served as commander of United States Army Europe and a commander of the Seventh United States Army.

Kroesen was injured in Heidelberg on September 15, 1981, when his armoured Mercedes was targeted with an RPG-7 anti-tank rocket. Responsibility for the attack was claimed by the "Kommando Gudrun Ensslin" of the Red Army Faction (aka Baader-Meinhof Gang). In 1991, West German prosecutors announced that former East German secret police leader Erich Mielke had been indicted for collusion with the attack.

Later life
After retiring from the army in 1983, Kroesen became a businessman. He was chairman of the board of Military Professional Resources Inc. (incorporated in 1987) and a senior fellow at the Institute of Land Warfare of the Association of the United States Army. He was a Vice-President of the American Security Council Foundation.
General Kroesen was a Compatriot of the George Washington Chapter of the Virginia Society of the Sons of the American Revolution based on the service of his ancestor, Johannes Kroesen, who served as a second lieutenant in the Bucks County Pennsylvania Militia during the Revolutionary War.

Kroesen died in Alexandria, Virginia, on April 30, 2020, at the age of 97 after a long illness. He was buried in Arlington National Cemetery.

Military education
Infantry Officer Candidate School, Fort Benning, Ga, 1944
Command and General Staff College, Fort Leavenworth, KS, 1956
Armed Forces Staff College, Norfolk, VA, 1959
United States Army War College, Carlisle Barracks, PA, 1962

Senior assignments
Commanding Officer, 196th Light Infantry Brigade (1968–1969)
Adviser to the Assistant Chief of Staff (J3), Military Assistance Command, Vietnam (1969–1970)
Assistant Chief of Staff (J3), Military Assistance Command, Vietnam (1970–1971)
Commanding General, 23rd Infantry Division (1971)
Commanding General, First Regional Assistance Command (1971–1972)
Deputy Commander, XXIV Corps (1972)
Commanding General, 82nd Airborne Division (1972–1974)
Deputy Commanding General, V Corps (1974–1975)
Commanding General, VII Corps (1975–1976)
Commanding General, United States Army Forces Command (1976–1978)
Vice Chief of Staff of the United States Army (1978–1979)
Commanding General, Seventh United States Army, United States Army Europe and NATO Central Army Group (1979–1983)

Awards and decorations

Other honors
Association of the United States Army Abrams Award, 2005
West Point Association of Graduates Sylvanus Thayer Award, 2007
American Veterans Center Audie Murphy Award, 2013
Sons of the American Revolution Gold Good Citizenship Medal, 2013
Honorary Sergeant Major of the Army, 2017
Namesake of the American Security Council Foundation General Frederick Kroesen Leadership Award
Chairman Emeritus of the board of MPRI
Life Member Emeritus, United States Army Officer Candidate School Alumni Association

Works
General Thoughts: Seventy Years with the Army. Publisher: Institute of Land Warfare, Association of the United States Army, 2003

References

External links
Interview with Kroesen for the ORAL HISTORY ARCHIVES OF WW-II

1923 births
2020 deaths
United States Army generals
United States Army personnel of World War II
United States Army personnel of the Korean War
United States Army personnel of the Vietnam War
United States Army Vice Chiefs of Staff
Recipients of the Distinguished Flying Cross (United States)
Recipients of the Legion of Merit
Recipients of the Silver Star
Recipients of the Distinguished Service Medal (US Army)
Recipients of the Air Medal
Recipients of the Defense Distinguished Service Medal
Recipients of the Distinguished Service Order (Vietnam)
Knights Commander of the Order of Merit of the Federal Republic of Germany
Terrorist incidents in Germany in 1981
American people of Dutch descent
Rutgers University alumni
Elliott School of International Affairs alumni
United States Army War College alumni
Joint Forces Staff College alumni
United States Army Command and General Staff College alumni
People from Lawrence Township, Mercer County, New Jersey
People from Phillipsburg, New Jersey
Military personnel from New Jersey
Sons of the American Revolution
Trenton Central High School alumni
American Security Council Foundation
Writers from New Jersey